Sunny Point may refer to:
 Military Ocean Terminal Sunny Point, a military terminal in Boiling Spring Lakes, North Carolina.
 Sunny Point, Koewarasan, a squatted village in Koewarasan, Suriname.